Maluszyn may refer to the following places in Poland:
Maluszyn, Łódź Voivodeship (central Poland)
Małuszyn, Lower Silesian Voivodeship (south-west Poland)
Maluszyn, Masovian Voivodeship (east-central Poland)